The Government of Turkey is the national government of Turkey. It is governed as a unitary state under a presidential representative democracy and a constitutional republic within a pluriform multi-party system. The term government can mean either the collective set of institutions (the executive, legislative, and judicial branches) or specifically the Cabinet (the executive).

Naming 
The republic is named "Turkey" or "Republic of Türkiye" with its full name. No other name appears in the Constitution, and this is the name that appears on money, in treaties, and in legal cases to which it is a party. The terms "Government of Turkey" or "Turkish Government" are often used in official documents to represent the national government as distinct from the local entities. Because the seat of government is in Ankara, "Ankara" is commonly used as a metonym for the central government.

Constitution 

According to the Constitution, Turkey's government system is based on a separation of powers. The Constitution states that the legislative power is vested in the Grand National Assembly of Turkey (art. 7), that the executive power is carried out by the President of Turkey (art. 8) and that the judicial power is exercised by independent and impartial courts (art. 9) It also states that parliamentary elections and presidential elections shall be held every five years (art. 77). The Parliament accepts the law proposals prepared by the deputies (88 art.) The President promulgates the laws adopted by the Parliament (art. 89). The President may veto some of the provisions of the law and return it to the Parliament for reconsideration, but the approval of the President is not needed if the majority of the Parliament rejects the reconsideration of the law or provisions of the law (art. 89). The President can appeal to the Constitutional Court for the annulment of all or certain provisions of laws on the grounds that they are unconstitutional in form or in content (art. 104/7). In such a case, the decision of the Constitutional Court is final (art. 153).

Branches of government

Legislative branch 

Legislative power is vested in a single-chamber parliament (the Grand National Assembly of Turkey) with 600 members. The members are elected for a period of five years according to the D'Hondt method. Every citizen over the age of eighteen is eligible to be a deputy. Members of the  Grand National Assembly can not hold office in state departments and other public corporate bodies and their subsidiaries.

Members of parliament can sit on behalf of a political party or as an independent parliamentarian. They are also delegates for the province in which they are elected. A simple majority is required to amend a law and a three-fifth majority to amend the constitution. Bills can be introduced by any member of parliament.

The duties and powers of the Grand National Assembly of Turkey are to enact, amend, and repeal laws; to debate and adopt the budget bills and final accounts bills; to decide to declare war; to approve the ratification of international treaties, to decide with the majority of three-fifths of the Grand National Assembly of Turkey to proclaim amnesty and pardon; and to exercise the powers and carry out the duties envisaged in the other articles of the Constitution.

Executive branch 
The executive power in the Turkish government is vested in the president of Turkey, where power is often delegated to the Cabinet members and other officials.

President 

The executive branch, under Part III of the Constitution, consists of the president and those to whom the president's powers are delegated. The president is both the head of state and government, as well as the military commander-in-chief. The president, according to the Constitution, must "ensure the implementation of the Constitution", and "ensure orderly and harmonious functioning of the organs of the State".

The president may sign legislation passed by the Parliament into law or may veto it, preventing it from becoming law unless a simple majority in the Parliament vote to override the veto. On the approval of the President, laws are published in the Official Gazette and they come into force by virtue of that publication unless a specific effective date is stipulated within the law itself. The President has also the ability to introduce pieces of legislation by issuing presidential decrees. However, laws introduced by the Parliament prevail over the presidential decrees with respect to the same subject in the hierarchy of norms. Furthermore, fundamental and personal rights or duties and political rights or duties cannot be regulated under presidential decrees.

Cabinet, ministries, and agencies 

The daily enforcement and administration of federal laws is in the hands of the various executive ministries, to deal with specific areas of national and international affairs. The Cabinet of Turkey includes the president and cabinet ministers. As part of the separation of the legislative branch from the executive branch, members of the cabinet cannot be a member of the parliament during their ministry.

In addition to ministries, a number of staff organizations are grouped into the Executive Office of the President. These include the National Security Council, the State Supervisory Council, the National Intelligence Organization, the Directorate of Communications, Disaster and Emergency Management Presidency and the Presidency of Strategy and Budget. There are also state-owned enterprises such as the Turkish Electricity Transmission Corporation.

Judicial branch 

The Constitutional Court, the Court of Cassation, the Council of State, and the Court of Jurisdictional Disputes are the supreme courts mentioned in the judicial section of the Constitution. The courts operate within the framework of civil law.

The Constitutional Court checks whether laws are in accordance with the constitution. Since 2005, the legal principles as laid down in the various international human rights treaties have also been assessed. Government institutions, governing parties, and the opposition have direct access to the Court. Citizens can also plead the alleged unconstitutionality of a particular law in an ongoing lawsuit.

International treaties, on ratification by the Parliament, have hierarchically the same effect as codes and statutes. However, international treaty provisions involving basic rights and freedoms prevail against domestic codes and statutes.

There are also specialised courts for certain legal areas within the scope of the powers of civil courts such as cadastral courts, commercial courts, consumer courts, intellectual and industrial property courts, and labour courts.
In certain disputes, some quasi-legal authorities must be used before applying to court such as the Sports Arbitration Committee and the Turkish Football Federation Arbitration Committee.

Elections and voting system 

All Turkish citizens over 18 years of age have the right to vote in elections and to take part in referendums. Turkish women achieved voting rights in local elections in 1930. Four years later, universal suffrage was implemented in all Turkish elections. Turkey has been a multi-party democracy since 1950.

A brief summary of the electoral systems used for each type of election is as follows:

Presidential elections: A two-round system, with the top two candidates contesting a run-off election two weeks after the initial election should no candidate win at least 50% +1 of the popular vote.
Parliamentary elections: The D'Hondt method, a party-list proportional representation system, to elect 600 Members of Parliament to the Grand National Assembly from 87 electoral districts that elect different numbers of MPs depending on their populations.
Local elections: Metropolitan and District Mayors, Municipal and Provincial Councillors, neighbourhood presidents and their village councils elected through a first-past-the-post system, with the winning candidate in each municipality elected by a simple majority.

Local administration  

The Constitution enumerates local governments as municipalities, special provincial administrations and villages. The administration of the provinces is based on the principle of devolution of powers. The regulatory and budgetary autonomy of local governments is secured in the Constitution.

A governor is representing the government in the province and is also the figurehead and executive organ of the special provincial administration. Governors act as the chairman of the provincial executive committee.

Finances

Taxation 

Most of the taxes are levied by the central government. However some specific taxes are levied by municipalities. Taxation system in Turkey is regulated by the Tax Procedure (TP) Law. It regulates the rights, burdens, carrying out duties along with principals of accrual. This Law consist of procedural and official provisions of all tax laws. The TP has five main sections: taxation, taxpayer duties, valuation, penalty provisions, tax cases.

Budget 
The budget document often begins with the president's proposal to Parliament recommending funding levels for the next fiscal year, beginning January 1 and ending on December 31 of the year following. The expenditure of the State and of public corporations other than state-owned enterprises (SOE's) are determined by annual central government budgets.

See also
 Politics of Turkey
 Cabinet of Turkey
 Constitution of Turkey
 Judicial system of Turkey
 Turkish Space Agency

References

External links
 

 
European governments
Asian governments